Highs in the Mid-Sixties, Volume 1 (subtitled LA '65 / Teenage Rebellion) is a compilation album of American garage rock and psychedelic rock recordings from the mid to late 1960s.  It was the first in a series that is nearly as long as the earlier Pebbles series of similar music (for which the Highs in the Mid-Sixties series is a companion series), although the Highs albums concentrate strictly on particular regions of the US – in this case, recordings that were released in Los Angeles, California.  (Despite the subtitle, however, not all of these records were originally released in 1965).

Highs in the Mid-Sixties, Volume 2, Highs in the Mid-Sixties, Volume 3, and Highs in the Mid-Sixties, Volume 20 also showcase music from Los Angeles; while two of the later CDs in the Pebbles series, Pebbles, Volume 8 and Pebbles, Volume 9 feature bands from throughout Southern California.

Release data
This album was released in 1983 as an LP by AIP Records (as #AIP-10003).

Notes on the tracks
The Standells were one of the best of the mid-sixties L.A. bands; this is a rare early track that was previously unreleased at this time.  The flip side of "Linda" by the Starfires is one of the most valuable and sought after garage rock songs, "I Never Loved Her", which was featured on the Pebbles, Volume 8 LP and CD.  The Epics have managed yet another take on the eternal "Louie Louie".  Gypsy Trips are actually from Oklahoma but settled in L.A.; this song was later covered by the Electric Prunes.  The Lyrics' "So What!" was a featured song on Pebbles, Volume 2.

Track listing

Side one

 The Avengers: "Be a Cave Man" (G. Paxton, G./W. Powell), 1:53
 The Colony: "All I Want" (Foley/Eucker), 2:28
 Sean & the Brandywines: "She Ain't No Good" (Rowbottom), 1:59 — rel. 1965
 The Epics: "Louie Come Home" (The Epics/Richard Berry), 2:30
 Limey & the Yanks: "Guaranteed Love" (Reed/Paxton), 2:24
 The Standells: "Someday You'll Cry" (Larry Tamblin), 2:27 — rel. 1965
 The Spats: "Tell Ya All About It, Baby" (Showalter/Johnson), 2:11 — rel. 1965
 The Grains of Sand: "That's When Happiness Began" (Addrisi/Addrisi), 2:18

Side two
 Gypsy Trips: "Ain't It Hard" (Roger Tillison/Terrye Tillison), 2:21
 The Rumors: "Hold Me Now", 2:27
 Warden & His Fugitives: "The World Ain't Changed" (Shields), 2:40
 The Road Runners: "Goodbye" (Randy Hall), 2:25
 The 4 Making Do: "The Simple Life" (E. G. Wells), 2:00
 The Answer: "I'll Be In" (T. Anderson/C. Wright), 2:22
 The Starfires: "Linda" (Freddie Fields), 1:55
 The Lyrics: "They Can't Hurt Me" (C. Gaylord), 2:43 — rel. 1965

Pebbles (series) albums
1983 compilation albums
Garage rock compilation albums
Acid rock compilation albums